†Pseudomelania is an extinct genus of fossil sea snails, marine gastropod mollusks in the family Pseudomelaniidae.

Species
Species within the genus Pseudomelania include:

subgenus Hudlestoniella
 Pseudomelania (Hudlestoniella) gubleri  Delpey, 1941

subgenus Oonia - synonym: Eligmoloxus Cossmann, 1885
 Oonia incrassata Kittl, 1899
 Oonia pennina Parona, 1892
 Oonia subtortilis Münster, 1841
 Oonia texta Kittl, 1899 
 Pseudomelania (Oonia) grossouvrei Cossmann, 1899
 Pseudomelania (Oonia) limneiformis Cossmann, 1885
 Pseudomelania (Oonia) similis Münster, 1841

subgenus Rhabdoconcha
 Pseudomelania (Rhabdoconcha) spirastriata Wang, 1977
 Rhabdoconcha brongniarti Klipstein, 1843
 Rhabdoconcha schaeferi Kittl, 1894
 Rhabdoconcha triadica Kittl, 1894

subgenus ?
 Pseudomelania aonis Kittl, 1894
 Pseudomelania calloviensis (Hébert & Deslongchamps, 1860)
 Pseudomelania feruglioi Ferrari, 2012 - It was described from the Early Jurassic period, (late Pliensbachian-early Toarcian) of Argentina by S. Mariel Ferrari.
 Pseudomelania frankei Kuhn, 1936
 Pseudomelania gaudryi Kittl, 1894
 Pseudomelania gracilis Mansuy, 1914
 Pseudomelania hagenowi Klipstein, 1843
 Pseudomelania miles Kittl, 1894
 Pseudomelania muensteri Wissmann, 1841
 Pseudomelania remtsaensis Cox, 1969
 Pseudomelania subsimilis Kittl, 1894
 Pseudomelania subterebra Kittl, 1894
 † Pseudomelania sutherlandii (Baily, 1855)
 Pseudomelania subula Kittl, 1894

References

 Kiel S. (2003) New taxonomic data for the gastropod fauna of the Umzamba Formation (Santonian–Campanian, South Africa); Cretaceous Research 24 (2003) 449–475

External links

Pseudomelaniidae